Psalm 35 is the 35th psalm of the Book of Psalms, beginning in English in the King James Version: "Plead my cause, O LORD, with them that strive with me: fight against them that fight against me." It is titled there: The Lord the Avenger of His People. The Book of Psalms is part of the third section of the Hebrew Bible, and a book of the Christian Old Testament. In the slightly different numbering system used in the Greek Septuagint and Latin Vulgate translations of the Bible, this psalm is Psalm 34. In Latin, it is known by the incipit, "". It is generally attributed to King David, although some commentators attribute it to the prophet Jeremiah.
 
Psalm 35 is used in both Jewish and Christian liturgies. It has been set to music, in German by Heinrich Schütz and in Latin by Marc-Antoine Charpentier, among others.

Text

Hebrew Bible version 
The following is the Hebrew text of Psalm 35:

King James Version 
 Plead my cause, O LORD, with them that strive with me: fight against them that fight against me.
 Take hold of shield and buckler, and stand up for mine help.
 Draw out also the spear, and stop the way against them that persecute me: say unto my soul, I am thy salvation.
 Let them be confounded and put to shame that seek after my soul: let them be turned back and brought to confusion that devise my hurt.
 Let them be as chaff before the wind: and let the angel of the LORD chase them.
 Let their way be dark and slippery: and let the angel of the LORD persecute them.
 For without cause have they hid for me their net in a pit, which without cause they have digged for my soul.
 Let destruction come upon him at unawares; and let his net that he hath hid catch himself: into that very destruction let him fall.
 And my soul shall be joyful in the LORD: it shall rejoice in his salvation.
 All my bones shall say, LORD, who is like unto thee, which deliverest the poor from him that is too strong for him, yea, the poor and the needy from him that spoileth him?
 False witnesses did rise up; they laid to my charge things that I knew not.
 They rewarded me evil for good to the spoiling of my soul.
 But as for me, when they were sick, my clothing was sackcloth: I humbled my soul with fasting; and my prayer returned into mine own bosom.
 I behaved myself as though he had been my friend or brother: I bowed down heavily, as one that mourneth for his mother.
 But in mine adversity they rejoiced, and gathered themselves together: yea, the abjects gathered themselves together against me, and I knew it not; they did tear me, and ceased not:
 With hypocritical mockers in feasts, they gnashed upon me with their teeth.
 Lord, how long wilt thou look on? rescue my soul from their destructions, my darling from the lions.
 I will give thee thanks in the great congregation: I will praise thee among much people.
 Let not them that are mine enemies wrongfully rejoice over me: neither let them wink with the eye that hate me without a cause.
 For they speak not peace: but they devise deceitful matters against them that are quiet in the land.
 Yea, they opened their mouth wide against me, and said, Aha, aha, our eye hath seen it.
 This thou hast seen, O LORD: keep not silence: O Lord, be not far from me.
 Stir up thyself, and awake to my judgment, even unto my cause, my God and my Lord.
 Judge me, O LORD my God, according to thy righteousness; and let them not rejoice over me.
 Let them not say in their hearts, Ah, so would we have it: let them not say, We have swallowed him up.
 Let them be ashamed and brought to confusion together that rejoice at mine hurt: let them be clothed with shame and dishonour that magnify themselves against me.
 Let them shout for joy, and be glad, that favour my righteous cause: yea, let them say continually, Let the LORD be magnified, which hath pleasure in the prosperity of his servant.
 And my tongue shall speak of thy righteousness and of thy praise all the day long.

Structure 
The Evangelical Heritage Version divides the psalm into an opening prayer (verses 1–3), an account of "the attacks of the wicked" against its author (verses 11–16), three petitions (verses 4–8, 17, and 19–27), and three vows (verses 9–10, 18 and 28).

Summary 
Relentless enemies are seeking the psalmist's life. Their hostility is groundless, and its maliciousness is aggravated by their ingratitude. He appeals to God to do him justice and deliver him. Each of these points is illustrated by the narrative of David's persecution by Saul in the First Book of Samuel; however, it is not against Saul himself that the psalm is directed, but against the men who fomented his insane jealousy.

Uses

Judaism 
 Verse 10 is part of Nishmat.

Christianity

New Testament 
 In the New Testament, verse 19b, They hated me without cause, is quoted in John , where Jesus states that the words are 'fulfilled' in himself.

Book of Common Prayer 
In the Church of England's Book of Common Prayer, this psalm is appointed to be read on the morning of the seventh day of the month.

Catholic Church 
Beginning in 1912, Psalm 35 has become part of the Tenebrae liturgy during the Holy Week.

Historical usage 
The first prayer when the American First Continental Congress met in early September 1774 was taken from Psalm 35:1.

Musical settings 
Heinrich Schütz wrote a setting of a paraphrase of Psalm 35 in German, "Herr, hader mit den Hadrern mein", SWV 132, for the Becker Psalter, published first in 1628. Marc-Antoine Charpentier wrote a motet in Latin, Judica Domine nocentes me, H. 201, for two voices, two treble instruments and continuo. and François Giroust.

References

External links

 
 
  in Hebrew and English - Mechon-mamre
 Text of Psalm 35 according to the 1928 Psalter
 Of David. / Oppose, O LORD, those who oppose me; war upon those who make war upon me. text and footnotes, usccb.org United States Conference of Catholic Bishops
 Psalm 35:1 introduction and text, biblestudytools.com
 Psalm 35 – “Awake to My Vindication” enduringword.com
 Psalm 33 / Refrain: Give me justice, O Lord my God, according to your righteousness. Church of England
 Psalm 35 at biblegateway.com
 Hymns for Psalm 35 hymnary.org

035
Works attributed to David